Dragon Lords of Melniboné is a role-playing game published by Chaosium in 2001.

Description
Dragon Lords of Melniboné is a d20 System version of the game Stormbringer.

Publication history
Dragon Lords of Melniboné was published by Chaosium in 2001.

The game features cover art by Frank Brunner.

Reception

References

Chaosium games
D20 System publications
Michael Moorcock's Multiverse
Role-playing games based on novels
Role-playing games introduced in 2001